KFAY (1030 AM, "NewsTalk 1030") is a radio station serving the Fayetteville, Arkansas, area with a News/talk radio format. It is under ownership of Cumulus Media. 1030 AM is a United States clear-channel frequency, on which WBZ in Boston is the dominant Class A station.

KFAY originally signed on as KGRH 1450 kHz, licensed to Fayetteville. It later changed callsign to KHOG and moved to 1440 kHz. KHOG programmed a top-40 format in the 1970s.  KHOG moved from 1440 kHz to 1030 kHz frequency in the mid-1980s under the ownership of Demaree Media.

References

External links 

News and talk radio stations in the United States
FAY
Radio stations established in 1982
Cumulus Media radio stations
1982 establishments in Arkansas